Chaghungenesh (also Romanized as Chāghūngenesh; also known as Chāghūn Kenesh and Chūngīnesh) is a village in Arshaq Sharqi Rural District, in the Central District of Ardabil County, Ardabil Province, Iran. At the 2006 census, its population was 115 in 26 families.

References 

Towns and villages in Ardabil County